Microcrambus discludellus is a moth in the family Crambidae. It was described by Heinrich Benno Möschler in 1890. It is found in the Dominican Republic, Puerto Rico and Colombia, as well as in North America, where it has been recorded from Florida and South Carolina.

References

Crambini
Moths described in 1890
Moths of North America